Jacek Krawczyk (born 1 January 1949) is a Polish former butterfly and medley swimmer. He competed in three events at the 1968 Summer Olympics.

References

External links
 

1949 births
Living people
Polish male butterfly swimmers
Polish male medley swimmers
Olympic swimmers of Poland
Swimmers at the 1968 Summer Olympics
Sportspeople from Katowice
20th-century Polish people